Duchy of Tuscany may refer to the following central Italian territories:

 Tuscia (568–774), duchy under the Lombards
 March of Tuscany (812–1197), frontier march of the Holy Roman Empire
 Duchy of Florence (1532–1569)
 Grand Duchy of Tuscany (1569–1859)